The International Journal of Methods in Psychiatric Research is a quarterly peer-reviewed open access medical journal covering research methods in psychiatry. It was established in 1991 and is published by John Wiley & Sons. Since 2012, it has been published exclusively online. The editor-in-chief is Hans-Ulrich Wittchen (TU Dresden) and Daniel S. Pine (National Institute of Mental Health). In January 2020, the journal became fully open access. According to the Journal Citation Reports, the journal has a 2020 impact factor of 4.035, ranking it 60th out of 156 journals in the category "Psychiatry" and 41st out of 144 in the category "Psychiatry: Social Science".

References

External links

Online-only journals
Psychiatry journals
Quarterly journals
Publications established in 1991
Wiley (publisher) academic journals
Research methods journals
English-language journals